Miguel Angel Lavié da Cunda, better known simply as Miguel Lavié (born 15 April 1986), is an Uruguayan professional football defender playing for Huracán F.C. in the Uruguayan Segunda División.

Club career
Born in Las Piedras, during his career he had previously played for Uruguayan clubs Juventud de Las Piedras, C.A. Peñarol and C.A. Bella Vista, Brazilian Criciúma Esporte Clube and Avaí Futebol Clube and a brief spell with Serbian SuperLiga club FK Javor Ivanjica along his compatriot Gerardo Vonder Pütten. In 2010, he moved back to Brazil to play with Campeonato Paulista side Rio Claro Futebol Clube. In May 2011 he signed with Liga Nacional de Fútbol de Guatemala club C.D. Suchitepéquez. He then played in Guatemala with Heredia Jaguares de Peten and Deportivo Coatepeque.

In January 2015 he left Guatemala and signed with Real Estelí F.C. playing in the Nicaraguan Primera División where he stayed till next January. It was then that he returned to Uruguay after so long having been playing abroad, and joined C.S.D. Villa Española. He helped Villa Española to finish runner-up of the 2015–16 Uruguayan Segunda División and get promotion to the 2016 Uruguayan Primera División. However, the team finished bottom and was relegated back to second level. In March 2017, Lavié left Villa Española and signed with another club from Montevideo also competing in second level, Huracán F.C.

National team
Lavié was part of the Uruguayan national under-17 and under-20 teams.

He was in the Uruguay team that won the U-17 International Soccer Tournament, played in September 2002 in Italy, which was held in memory of the September 11 attacks.  He was the captain at the 2003 South American Under-17 Football Championship where Uruguay finished 4th.  Afterwards, he was part of Uruguay team at the 2005 South American Youth Championship.

References

External sources
 Miguel Angel Lavié da Cunda at BDFA.com.ar 
 Miguel Lavié in 2badm.
 Profile and photo at Javor official website.

Living people
1986 births
Uruguayan footballers
Uruguayan expatriate footballers
Association football defenders
Peñarol players
C.A. Bella Vista players
Criciúma Esporte Clube players
Avaí FC players
Rio Claro Futebol Clube players
Expatriate footballers in Brazil
FK Javor Ivanjica players
Expatriate footballers in Serbia
C.D. Suchitepéquez players
Heredia Jaguares de Peten players
Deportivo Coatepeque players
Expatriate footballers in Guatemala
Real Estelí F.C. players
Expatriate footballers in Nicaragua